The 18th Field Artillery Regiment is a field artillery regiment of the United States Army first formed in 1916.

History
The '18th Field Artillery was organized 1 June 1917 in the Regular Army.

Lineage

Distinctive unit insignia
Description
A gold color metal and enamel device 1 1/16 inches (2.70 cm) in height consisting of a shield blazoned: Azure, three bendlets sinister Argent, a bend double-cottized potente counter-potente Or; on a canton Gules a mullet within a fish-hook fesswise, ring to dexter and barb to base, of the second (for the 5th Field Artillery).

Symbolism
The shield is the shoulder patch of the 3rd Division, the bend and bendlets are from the arms of Champagne. The canton indicates the parentage of the regiment. The fishhook and Star are from the coat of arms of the 5th Field Artillery; the union battle line of Gettysburg was in the shape of a fishhook and the corps badge of Slocum's 12th Corps was a star.

Background
The distinctive unit insignia was originally approved for the 18th Field Artillery Regiment on 2 October 1923. It was amended to correct the method of wear on 25 May 1925. It was amended to correct the blazon on 12 July 1928. It was redesignated for the 18th Field Artillery Battalion on 4 September 1943. The insignia was redesignated for the 18th Artillery Regiment on 18 November 1958. It was again redesignated for the 18th Field Artillery Regiment effective 1 September 1971.

Coat of arms
Blazon
Shield
Azure, three bendlets sinister Argent, a bend double-cottized potente counter-potente Or; on a canton Gules a mullet within a fish-hook fesswise, ring to dexter and barb to base, of the second (for the 5th Field Artillery).
Crest
On a wreath of the colors Argent and Azure an eagle's head erased Or gorged with a collar Sable charged with a Lorraine cross of the first.

Symbolism
Shield
The shield is the shoulder patch of the 3rd Division, the bend and bendlets are from the arms of Champagne. The canton indicates the parentage of the regiment. The fishhook and Star are from the coat of arms of the 5th Field Artillery; the union battle line of Gettysburg was in the shape of a fishhook and the corps badge of Slocum's 12th Corps was a star.
Crest
The crest is from the coat of arms of St. Mihiel.
Motto
The motto is an extract from the citation received by the 18th.

Background
The coat of arms was originally approved for the 18th Field Artillery Regiment on 18 May 1923. It was amended to correct the blazon on 12 July 1928. It was redesignated for the 18th Field Artillery Battalion on 4 September 1943. The insignia was redesignated for the 18th Artillery Regiment on 18 November 1958. It was again redesignated for the 18th Field Artillery Regiment effective 1 September 1971.

Current configuration
 1st Battalion 18th Field Artillery Regiment (United States)
 2nd Battalion, 18th Field Artillery Regiment  2nd Battalion, 18th Field Artillery Regiment (2-18th FAR) is a (M270A1 MLRS) Multiple Launch Rocket System unit in the 75th Field Artillery Brigade (United States), currently based at Fort Sill, Oklahoma and supports III Corps. 75th Field Artillery Brigade (United States)
 3rd Battalion 18th Field Artillery Regiment (United States)  inactive 
 4th Battalion 18th Field Artillery Regiment - Inactive since 1992.  Last assigned to 41st Field Artillery Brigade, Babenhausen, Hessen, Germany.
 5th Battalion 18th Field Artillery Regiment
 6th Battalion 18th Field Artillery Regiment (United States)

See also
 Field Artillery Branch (United States)
 U.S. Army Coast Artillery Corps

References

 https://web.archive.org/web/20120616121659/http://www.tioh.hqda.pentagon.mil/Heraldry/ArmyDUISSICOA/ArmyHeraldryUnit.aspx?u=3424

External links
 http://www.history.army.mil/html/forcestruc/lineages/branches/fa/default.htm 

018
F 018
018
Military units and formations established in 1916